EEGLAB is a MATLAB toolbox distributed under the free BSD license for processing data from electroencephalography (EEG), magnetoencephalography (MEG), and other electrophysiological signals. Along with all the basic processing tools, EEGLAB implements independent component analysis (ICA), time/frequency analysis, artifact rejection, and several modes of data visualization. EEGLAB allows users to import their electrophysiological data in about 20 binary file formats, preprocess the data, visualize activity in single trials, and perform ICA. Artifactual ICA components may be subtracted from the data. Alternatively, ICA components representing brain activity may be further processed and analyzed. EEGLAB also allows users to group data from several subjects, and to cluster their independent components.

History
In 1997, a set of data processing functions was first released on the Internet by Scott Makeig in the Computational Neurobiology Laboratory directed by Terry Sejnowski at the Salk Institute, under the name “the ICA/EEG toolbox”. In 2000, Arnaud Delorme designed a graphical user interface on top of these functions along with some of his own artifact removal functions, and released the first version of the “EEGLAB software for artifact removal”. In 2003, Delorme and Makeig joined efforts to release the first stable and fully documented version of EEGLAB. In 2004, EEGLAB was awarded funding by the NIH for continued development of research software.

Statistics

EEGLAB was downloaded about 25,000 times from 73 countries worldwide in its first three years (2003–2006) and in 2011 was reported to be the most widely used signal processing environment for processing of EEG data by cognitive neuroscientists (survey results).  Its reference paper (Delorme & Makeig, 2004) has received over 12,400 citations (02/2013).

EEGLAB comprises over 380 stand-alone MATLAB functions and over 50,000 lines of code and hosts over 20 user-contributed plug-ins. Significant plug-in toolboxes continue to be written and published by researchers at the Swartz Center, UCSD, and by many other groups. 
Major plug-ins include: 
 DIPFIT, for source localization of ICA component sources of EEG data;  
 ERPLAB, for deriving measures from average event-related potentials;
 FASTER, a fully automated, unsupervised method for processing high density EEG data;  
 NBT, a toolbox for the computation and integration of neurophysiological biomarkers; 
 NFT, for building electrical forward head models from MR images and/or electrode positions; 
 SIFT, a source information flow toolbox; 
 BCILAB, an extensive environment for building and testing brain–computer interface models; 
Hundreds of researchers have contributed directly or indirectly to the software by programming functions or reporting bugs. The current eeglablist email discussion list has over 5,000 members worldwide (2013).

See also

Other open-source toolboxes for neurophysiological signals processing include:

 MNE-Python (Python)
 Neurophysiological Biomarker Toolbox (MatLab)
 NeuroKit (Python)

References 

Free mathematics software
Magnetoencephalography
Electroencephalography